Nathan Wright Stuckey (December 17, 1933 – August 24, 1988) was an American country singer. He recorded for various labels between 1966 and 1978, charting in the top 10 of Hot Country Songs with "Sweet Thang", "Plastic Saddle", "Sweet Thang and Cisco" and "Take Time to Love Her"

Biography
Reared in Atlanta in Cass County, Texas, United States, Stuckey attended Arlington State College, now the University of Texas at Arlington, from which he earned a radio and television degree. Stuckey established himself as a radio announcer, first at KALT in Atlanta, Texas, and then at KWKH in Shreveport, Louisiana, where he worked alongside Frank Page and Louise Alley, a pioneer woman broadcaster and owner of an advertising agency. Along with Jim Reeves, Stuckey became a member of the former KWKH Country music show known as the Louisiana Hayride.

In 1965, Stuckey co-wrote Buck Owens' number-one single "Waitin' in Your Welfare Line". He then wrote and recorded "Sweet Thang" on Paula Records.

Another of Stuckey's compositions, "Pop a Top", was recorded by Jim Ed Brown on RCA Records in 1967 and by Alan Jackson in 1999. A year later, Stuckey signed with RCA himself. Among his hits for RCA were "Plastic Saddle" and "Sweet Thing and Cisco".

Stuckey teamed with Connie Smith on the duet of "Young Love", followed by another single and two albums. The duo was in the final nominations for a Grammy for their version of "Whispering Hope".

After seven years with RCA, Stuckey signed with MCA Records. With Conway Twitty and David Barnes producing, his single "Sun Comin' Up" made the top 20, but none of his other MCA releases did. He last charted in 1978 with the number 26 single "The Days of Sand and Shovels".

Stuckey also went on to direct in producing sessions, along with announcing and singing jingles on hundreds of regional and national commercials. He wrote two jingles for Coca-Cola in the 1970s, recorded twenty-two spots of McDonald's, and was the singing voice on the last Spuds MacKenzie commercial for Budweiser. He continued recording jingles into the 1980s.

Another project was the ownership of Music Row Talent, Inc., a booking agency in Nashville, Tennessee, which was in business for twelve years. Through his Texas Promise Land Development Company, Stuckey began acquiring land in both Tennessee and Texas.

Shortly before Stuckey's death, Randy Travis released "Diggin' Up Bones", which Stuckey co-wrote.

On August 24, 1988, Stuckey died of lung cancer in a Nashville, Tennessee hospital.

Discography

Albums

Singles

References

External links
[ Nat Stuckey] at AllMusic

American country singer-songwriters
Singer-songwriters from Texas
1933 births
1988 deaths
People from Atlanta, Texas
20th-century American singers
Country musicians from Texas